John Browne may refer to:

Politicians
John Browne (died 1570), Warden of the Mint and Member of Parliament (MP) for Aldborough
John Browne (died ?1602), MP for Dunwich
John Browne (MP for Morpeth), MP for Morpeth, 1601
John Browne (Parliamentarian) (1582–1659), English politician who sat in the House of Commons at various times between 1621 and 1653
John Browne (MP for Gloucester) (died 1638), Member of Parliament for Gloucester
John Denis Browne (1798–1862), Member of the UK Parliament for Mayo
John Browne (1696–1750), MP for Dorchester
John Browne, 1st Baron Kilmaine (1726–1794), Irish politician
John Browne, 1st Marquess of Sligo (1756–1809), Irish peer and politician
John Browne, 1st Earl of Altamont (c. 1709–1776), Irish peer and politician
John Browne, 3rd Baron Kilmaine (1794–1873), Anglo-Irish politician and landowner
John Browne, 5th Baron Kilmaine (1878–1936), Anglo-Irish politician and landowner
John Browne, 4th Marquess of Sligo (1824–1903), Irish politician and naval commander
John T. Browne (1845–1941), mayor of Houston
John Ferguson Browne (1920–2014), former Canadian politician, manager and traffic manager
John Browne (Fine Gael politician) (1936–2019), Irish Fine Gael politician
John Browne (Conservative politician) (born 1938), UK Conservative MP for Winchester, 1979–1992
John Browne, Baron Browne of Madingley (born 1948), Baron Browne of Madingley, former Group Chief Executive of BP
John Browne (Fianna Fáil politician) (born 1948), Irish Fianna Fáil politician

Others
John Harris Browne (1817–1904), English born explorer of Australia
John Browne (composer) (fl. c. 1490), composer represented by several pieces in the Eton choirbook
John C. Browne (born 1942), former director of Los Alamos National Laboratory
John Browne (King's Gunfounder) (died 1651), first holder of the post of King's Gunfounder (in 1615)
John Browne (academic) (died 1764), Master of University College, Oxford (1742–1762)
John Browne (anatomist) (1642–1702), British anatomist and surgeon
John Browne (hurler) (born 1977), former Irish hurler
John Browne (artist) (1741–1801), British engraver and landscape artist
John Browne (sheriff) (died 1589), Irish mapmaker and sheriff
John Browne, 6th Baron Kilmaine (1902–1978), Anglo-Irish peer and building conservationist
John Collis Browne (1819–1884), British Army officer
John Henry Browne (born 1946), criminal defense attorney practicing in Seattle, Washington
John Ross Browne (1821–1875), Irish-American writer
John Browne (scientist) (1904–1984), English-born Canadian physician
John Browne (chemist) (died 1735), English chemist
John Browne (archdeacon of Limerick)
John Browne (archdeacon of Elphin)

See also
John Brown (disambiguation)